Changsha Huanghua International Airport  is the airport serving Changsha, the capital of Hunan province, China, and the Greater Changsha Metropolitan Region comprising the nearby cities of Zhuzhou and Xiangtan. 

As of 2021, it was one of the 50 busiest airports in the world, the 12th busiest civil airport in China, the second busiest in South Central China after Guangzhou Baiyun International Airport and the busiest in Central China. 

The airport is managed by the Hunan Airport Authority, a publicly owned corporation managing all five airports in Hunan Province. Huanghua airport was opened in August 1989, replacing Changsha Datuopu Airport, which is now a military air base.

Terminals

Terminal 1
It was opened in 2000, and the proposed capacity was 4.6 million passengers annually. Terminal 1 was closed for renovation from July 2011 to 17 May 2018 after Terminal 2 became fully operational.

Terminal 1 reopened on 18 May 2018. After renovation, Terminal 1 has  of space, 38 check-in counters, 10 security lanes and 10 aerobridges. It has the capacity of six million passengers annually. Terminal 1 serves Air China, Chengdu Airlines, Joy Air, Okay Airways, Tibet Airlines, Shandong Airlines, Shenzhen Airlines and Kunming Airlines.

Terminal 2
The inauguration of Terminal 2 was on July 19, 2011. With  of space, the new terminal is the fifth largest airport terminal in mainland China (after Beijing–Capital, Shanghai–Pudong, Guangzhou, and Shenzhen). The new terminal has 22 bridge gates, to which the longest passenger walking distance is within . With this new facility, the airport can handle 151,000 aircraft movements and another 15.6 million passengers every year. The peak hour volume of passengers is 3,940.

The departure hall has four automatic double-glass-door entrances which are directly facing check-in areas A, B, C, & D respectively. Entrances 1-3 are domestic entrances and Entrance 4 is for international, Hong Kong, Macau and Taiwan Departures, which will be checked in at Area D. Area A is the exclusive check-in area for China Southern Airlines. Areas B and C are domestic check-in areas for other airlines. The terminal has 80 check-in counters and 24 self-checkin kiosks, 24 security checkpoints and more than 6,390 seats.

The arrival hall is equipped with eight baggage carousels (six at domestic area and two at international area). The indoor parking garage P4, which has 693 parking spaces, is on floor B2. There are also three outdoor parking areas, P1,2&3, which provide over 1000 parking spaces.

History
From 1957 to 1989, Datuopu Airport served as a dual-use military and civil airport for Changsha. It was only capable of handling small aircraft and a few flights per day. The Hunan Provincial Government proposed the construction of a new airport in October 1984, which was approved by the State Council of China. Construction for Huanghua Airport began in June 1986, and it was opened on 29 August 1989, when all civil flights were transferred to the new airport, and Datuopu reverted to sole military use.

On October 28, 2000, the  Terminal 1-A, which cost 40.4 million CNY, was opened. The airport was capable of handling 4.6 million passengers per year. Afterwards, the construction of Terminal 1-B and Terminal 1-C were finished to ensure growing passengers and cargo.

The airport welcomed its first intercontinental destination when China Southern Airlines began service to Frankfurt, Germany on 23 June 2014.

The construction of the second runway was completed in November, 2016. The second runway officially came into use on March 30, 2017. The new runway means that Huanghua Airport is now ranked as a 4F, the highest level for an airport, and capable of accommodating wide-body aircraft such as the A380.

On May 16, 2018, the renovated Terminal 1 of the Changsha Huanghua International Airport resumes operation. The domestic flights operated by Air China, Shenzhen Airlines, Shandong Airlines, Chengdu Airlines, Kunming Airlines, Okay Airways, Joy Air, and Tibet Airlines arrive at T1.

Short-Term Expansion

The airport is undergoing a major expansion eastwards. The airport will be capable of handling 60 million passengers annually and an annual cargo capacity of six million tons. The airport becomes a hub in Central China after this stage.

Long-term expansion
Terminal 4 is to be constructed on the north side of the East terminal area. The east terminal area, in which both Terminals 3&4 lie, is located between the second and third runways. At the final stage, the fourth parallel runway of 4E will be constructed  in the east of the third runway. Two tunnels connecting the west area (Terminal 1&2) and the east terminals (Terminal 3&4) are considered.

Changsha Huanghua Int'l airport will become a major hub in China which hosts a number of based airlines. The ultimate capacity of the airport will be 90 million passengers annually.

Airlines and destinations

Passenger

Cargo

Statistics
As for 2016, Changsha Huanghua International Airport was the 13th busiest airport in the People's Republic of China with 21,296,700 passengers.

Ground transportation

Maglev

 The regular-speed Changsha Maglev Express connects Changsha Huanghua International Airport and Changsha South railway station, it started operation on 6 May 2016.
 The Maglev line is 18.5 km long and trains and runs at a speed of 120 km/h to finish the journey in just over 10 minutes.
 The ticket price is ￥20 between the Airport and South Railway Station. Metro-card holders can receive a 10% discount.

Metro
 Line 6 of Changsha Metro also reaches the airport via Huanghua Airport T1 & T2 station.

Rail
 The planned Changsha–Ganzhou high-speed railway will have an airport railway station.

Bus 

 There are direct shuttle buses connecting the airport with Hunan Civil Aviation Hotel (with one stop at Gao Qiao on the way), Changsha South Railway Station, and South Bus Station

Gallery

See also
List of airports in China
List of the busiest airports in China

References

External links

Official Hunan Provincial Airport Authority website

Airports in Hunan
Transport in Changsha
Airports established in 1989
1989 establishments in China